Michael Wayne Barker (born June 7, 1968) is an American writer, producer and former voice actor best known for his work on the Fox adult animated television series Family Guy and for co-creating American Dad!. He has also done voice work on both series.

Career
Mike Barker worked with Seth MacFarlane and Matt Weitzman as a writer and producer on early seasons of Family Guy. He has also voiced some of the characters on Family Guy and American Dad, most notably Terry Bates, the gay local co-anchorperson.

In 2003, MacFarlane presented to Barker an idea for a new adult animated series. The idea revolved around a conservative father and his liberal hippie daughter. Barker accepted the offer to develop the series with MacFarlane and Weitzman. Barker also provided voice work for the series. MacFarlane has credited Barker and Weitzman with American Dad!s success and longevity, stating that the two of them have been in charge of creative direction over the series since its beginning.

It was announced on November 4, 2013 that Barker had departed American Dad! after 10 seasons with the program, and was replaced by Weitzman as the series' sole showrunner. Barker remains under an overall contract with 20th Century Fox Television.

References

External links
 
 

American male screenwriters
Film producers from California
Living people
1968 births
Writers from Los Angeles
University of Arizona alumni
American television writers
American male television writers
Screenwriters from California
Screenwriters from Arizona
Film producers from Arizona